Ibrahim Said (born 16 October 1979) is an Egyptian retired professional footballer who played as a centre back.

Career

After the long lay-off away from the playing field, Ibrahim slowly but surely started to prove just how talented he was, and became one of the key members of the Zamalek squad. Thanks to his good form with Zamalek, "Heema"(as fans refer to him as) was called up to the Egyptian national team in the run-up to the 2006 African Nations Cup which was to be played in Egypt. Ibrahim made some remarkable performances in the tournament, shoring up the Egyptian defensive line as a sweeper & stopper.

In Turkey
The opening of the 2007 winter transfer window saw Ibrahim move to Turkey, joining Caykur Rizespor. In summer the same year, Said was signed by Ankaragücü in light of his success at  Caykur Rizespor.

Back To Egypt
At the start of the 2008–09 season, Said joined Egyptian Side Ismaily. But due to disagreement with the board, He terminated his Contract.

In Libya
At the 2009–10 season, Said joined Al-Ahly Tripoli club.

North America
With the help of the goalkeeping coach Zaki Abdul Fattah in the United States, Said went on a 14-day trial with Toronto FC. He played 3 pre-season matches with the Canadian team, but due to disagreement on financial issues, he decided not to sign for them. He moved back to New York City, although Philadelphia Union offered him a contract, he decided to not sign for them as well, then he moved back to Egypt.

Return to Egypt with Al-Ittihad Al-Sakandary
He returned to Egypt at the beginning of the 2010–11 season joining Al-Ittihad Al-Sakndary but following a dispute with then Head Coach Carlos Cabral he was sidelined for the majority of the first half of the season but returned after Cabral 's resignation in a match against former club Al Ahly.

Manager career

Goldi SC
In January 2016, he was signed as a player-manager for Egyptian Third Division side Goldi.

Career statistics

International goals
Scores and results list Egypt's goal tally first:

Titles
Club
Al Ahly
 Egyptian Premier League: 1998–99, 1999–2000
 Egypt Cup: 2000–01, 2002–03
 CAF Champions League: 2001
 CAF Super Cup: 2002

International
Egypt
 Africa Cup of Nations: 2006, 2008
 Pan Arab Games Gold Medal: 2007

Sources
Short Bio on Said's short stay at Everton

References 

1979 births
Living people
Egyptian footballers
Egypt international footballers
2000 African Cup of Nations players
2002 African Cup of Nations players
2006 Africa Cup of Nations players
2008 Africa Cup of Nations players
Ankaraspor footballers
Çaykur Rizespor footballers
Everton F.C. players
Zamalek SC players
Ismaily SC players
Al-Ahli SC (Tripoli) players
Al Ittihad Alexandria Club players
Süper Lig players
Egyptian expatriate footballers
Expatriate footballers in Turkey
Egyptian expatriate sportspeople in Libya
Expatriate footballers in Libya
Egyptian expatriate sportspeople in Turkey
Expatriate footballers in England
Sportspeople from Alexandria
Egyptian Premier League players
Association football defenders
Libyan Premier League players